Peperomia vareschii is a species of subshrub in the genus Peperomia. It primarily grows in wet tropical biomes.

Etymology
vareschii came from the full name "Volkmar Vareschi". Volkmar Vareschi is an Austrian ecologist who mainly focuses on lichens and ferns in Venezuela.  This refers to his discovery of lichens and ferns in Venezuela.

Distribution
Peperomia vareschii is native to Venezuela. 

Venezuela
Trujillo

See also
Volkmar Vareschi

References

External links
Volkmar Vareschi taxa

vareschii
Flora of South America
Flora of Venezuela
Plants described in 1963
Taxa named by Truman G. Yuncker